Robert Beaven (January 20, 1836 – September 18, 1920), son of James Beaven, was a British Columbia politician and businessman. Beaven moved to British Columbia from Toronto, where he had been educated at Upper Canada College, because of the gold rush. He entered business in Victoria, which was then the capital of the Colony of Vancouver Island. After the colony's union with British Columbia, Beaven became involved with politics as secretary of Amor De Cosmos' Confederation League which advocated that the colony enter Canadian Confederation.

Beaven was elected to the provincial legislature in 1871, the year of union with Canada, and served in the cabinets of De Cosmos and his successor George Anthony Walkem as chief commissioner of land and works. He was accused by the opposition of corruption and was criticised for not opening up land for settlement quickly enough as well as running up the deficit. Beaven was in opposition during the government of Andrew Charles Elliott but rejoined the government when Walkem became premier for a second time in 1878 and became minister of finance and agriculture. Due to a shortage of revenues he instituted a poll tax in 1881.  In 1882 Beaven became premier of the province but many of his supporters were defeated in the subsequent July election and Beaven ruled with a minority.

As Premier he hosted the three-month visit to British Columbia of the Governor General of Canada, the Marquess of Lorne, and his wife Princess Louise, offering to make the princess Queen of Vancouver Island. She declined.

In January 1883 Beaven attempted to introduce a legislative program but his government was brought down by a Motion of No Confidence and he resigned on January 29, 1883.

Beaven remained an MLA and leader of the opposition until 1894 when he lost his seat in an election after having served in the legislature for twenty-three years. He also served three terms as mayor of Victoria, British Columbia in the 1890s.

Following the 1898 election, no party had a majority and the lieutenant-governor Thomas Robert McInnes passed over the former premier John Herbert Turner and asked Beaven to form a government despite the fact that he had been out of the legislature for four years. Leading members of the legislature refused to support Beaven and he was unable to form a cabinet.

Robert Beaven died in 1920 and was interred in the Ross Bay Cemetery in Victoria.

External links 
Biography at the Dictionary of Canadian Biography Online

1836 births
1920 deaths
Premiers of British Columbia
Canadian Anglicans
English emigrants to pre-Confederation Ontario
Mayors of Victoria, British Columbia
Politicians from Toronto
Immigrants to Upper Canada
Colony of British Columbia (1866–1871) people
Upper Canada College alumni
English emigrants to pre-Confederation British Columbia